Džumhur is a Bosnian surname, derived from Turkish cumhur meaning "the people", ultimately of Arabic origin. Notable people with the surname include:

Damir Džumhur (born 1992), Bosnian tennis player
Zuko Džumhur (1920–1989), Bosnian writer, painter, and caricaturist

Bosnian surnames